The Edward B. Bunn, S.J. Intercultural Center commonly known as the Intercultural Center or ICC is a seven-story mixed use building on the main campus of Georgetown University named for Edward B. Bunn. The center was built in 1982 as the Photovoltaic Higher Education National Exemplar Facility in conjunction with a grant from the U.S. Department of Energy. The facility hosts numerous administrative offices, student facilities, and conference spaces, but is best known for its contribution to solar power development. Among the occupants of the building are the Edmund A. Walsh School of Foreign Service, the Center for Contemporary Arab Studies, the Prince Alwaleed Bin Talal Center for Muslim-Christian Understanding, and several departments of Georgetown College.

History

In 1980 Georgetown University applied to the Department of Energy for a grant to fund the construction of an intercultural center that would showcase the potential use building integration of photovoltaic panels to produce electrical power. While the Congressional funding for the solar panels came as a result of heightened awareness of energy issues following the 1973 oil embargo, the funding for the structure itself came as a result of Georgetown's goal of improving American education in foreign languages and international affairs, which was deemed deficient in the post-Vietnam era. This was part of Georgetown's effort at the time to secure federal funding for model projects that could be replicated at other universities and institutions across the nation.

Construction began in early 1980 and the building itself was completed in May 1982 at a cost of $23,000,000. The interior of the building consists of six floors of educational space and a seventh maintenance floor, altogether totaling . While at the time the center was considered futuristic, a "dark spaceship" on the historic campus, it has since become incorporated into the campus with its Red Square courtyard serving as a student gathering area.

Solar panels

In its original plans it would have been the largest photovoltaic installation in the world and as completed was one of the largest ever constructed. Additionally, the solar panels that were installed used a rough glass that reduced efficiency, but prevented glare from affecting airplanes operating out of nearby Reagan National Airport.

While it had been designed with the installation of solar panels in mind, they were not installed until late 1984 by the Solarex Corporation at a cost of approximately $10,000,000. Solarex was later purchased by the Amoco oil company and sold in 1995 to the Enron energy company. The center has been recognized as being ahead of its time in the promotion of renewable energy sources and for continuing to operate as designed, decades after its construction.

References

Georgetown University buildings
University and college buildings completed in 1982
Event venues established in 1982
1982 establishments in Washington, D.C.